The 1975 Central American and Caribbean Championships in Athletics were held at the Estadio Francisco Montaner in Ponce, Puerto Rico between 6–10 August.

Medal summary

Men's events

Women's events

Medal table

External links
Men Results - GBR Athletics
Women Results - GBR Athletics

Central American and Caribbean Championships in Athletics
Central American and Caribbean Championships
International athletics competitions hosted by Puerto Rico
Central American and Caribbean Championships
Sports events in Ponce, Puerto Rico